The Institute of Optronics (IOP) is an administrative research weapons engineering institute located in Rawalpindi, Punjab Province of Pakistan. The IOP is noted for its production of advanced military technologies produced for the Pakistan Armed Forces.

History

The Institute of Optronics (IOP) was established in 1984 as a project led Ministry of Defence (MoD) of Government of Pakistan. The project was led by then-Director-General of the DESTO Lieutenant-General Talat Masood who supervised the construction of the institute.

After it was made fully functional, the IOP's were handed over to civilian management. Dr. Akram Hussain Abidi, a scientist in the field of optical physics and former NASA senior scientist, was its pioneer, Director-General. Presently the organization is working under the Ministry of Defence Production, Government of Pakistan.

ROLE and TASK of IOP include Undertaking Research & Development, and production of

NVDs
Laser Rangefinders
Thermal Imaging Systems
Battle Field Surveillance Systems
Other Commercial, Industrial, and Military Optronics' Products

See also
 Night vision device
 AN/PVS-4
 AN/PVS-14
 IDEAS

References

External links
Official Website of Ministry of Defence Production, Government of Pakistan
ideas Pakistan, Institute of Optronics

Optoelectronics
Pakistan federal departments and agencies
1984 establishments in Pakistan